Daniel Robert Odier (born 17 May 1945 in Geneva), is a Zen master, Chan master, writer, poet, screenwriter and essayist, specialist in Kashmir Shaivism. Praised by Anaïs Nin as "an outstanding writer and a dazzling poet," he is also a spiritual teacher of Eastern religious traditions, especially Tantra.

Biography
Daniel Odier began studies at the school of Beaux Arts at Rome but later chose to focus on writing rather than painting.  He received his university degree in Paris and was employed by a leading Swiss newspaper as a music critic.  He has taught screenwriting at the University of Tulsa in Oklahoma.

Fascinated by Chan (the Chinese origin of zen), Daniel Odier decided to study the proximity of Chan and Tantra, inspired by the work of the Chinese hermit Chien Ming Chen, whom he met in Kalimpong in 1968. Also in 1968, Daniel Odier becomes a disciple of Kalu Rinpoche for seven years; he receives from his master the transmission of the Mahamudra.

In 1975, he met in a himalayan hermitage a Kashmiri Shivaïte yogini called Lalitâ Devî, a decisive meeting which he recounts in his various works on Tantra. He receives from Lalitâ Devî the transmission of Mahamudra and of the mystical teachings of the Pratyabhijñā and Spanda schools of the Kaula tradition. He then specialized in Kashmiri Shaivism, which he taught in several countries (France, Italy, Germany, Belgium, United States ...).

In 1995, Daniel Odier founded the "Tantra/Chan centre" in Paris, which he dissolved in 2000 in order to encourage independent spiritual practice. He has taught courses on Eastern spiritual traditions at the University of California.

In 2004, he received dharma transmission from Jing Hui, abbot of Bailin Monastery and dharma successor of Hsu Yun, using the name "Ming Qing".

Daniel Odier is most of all a teacher of Kashmir Shaivism; he relates in his book Tantric Quest his mystical initiation from a tantric dakini, Lalita Devi, in Kashmir.

He was married to the violinist Nell Gotkovsky (died 1998).

Works
Apart from his works on Tantra, Odier is best known for a series of six novels published under the pseudonym 'Delacorta.' The books center around Serge Gorodish, a classically trained pianist with depressive tendencies, and his underage protégée named Alba. The two enjoy an intense romantic relationship (never actually consummated), and embark together upon various confidence schemes and other intrigues. These often result in the death or discomfiture of less sympathetic characters, although Alba and Gorodish themselves appear to be motivated more by their own profit and amusement than by any moral considerations. The series includes the novel Diva which was later used as the basis for a popular French film of the same name. Odier has also used the Delacorta pseudonym for several unrelated books (mostly detective novels or thrillers) and as a screenwriter.  The Alba/Gorodish books have appeared in omnibus editions in French and have been published in numerous other languages. Most of Odier's other fiction remains untranslated.

In addition to Diva, film adaptations of Odier's books include Light Years Away (from the novel, La voie sauvage) and a French television film based on the Delacorta novel Rock (Lola). Odier's own screenwriting credits include the films Invitation au voyage (1982) and Celestial Clockwork (1995).

Bibliography

Fiction, Poetry and Criticism 
 Transparences (poetry, 1964)
 Le soleil dans la poche (poetry, 1965)
 Rouge (1967)
 Entretiens avec William Burroughs (1969; English trans. The Job: Interviews with William S. Burroughs, 1969)
 Nuit contre nuit (poetry, 1972)
 Le voyage de John O'Flaherty (novel, 1972; republished 1997 as L'illusionniste)
 Éclats d'ombre (1972)
 La voie sauvage (novel, 1974)
 Ming (novel, 1976)
 Splendor solis (1976)
 L'année du lièvre (novel, 1978)
 Le milieu du monde: une fabuleuse traversée de l'histoire Suisse (novel, 1979)
 Petit déjeuner sur un tapis rouge (novel, 1982)
 Gioconda (novel, 1984)
 Cécilia (opera libretto, 1985)
 Le baiser cannibale (novel, 1987; English trans. Cannibal Kiss, 1989)
 Le clavecin (novel, 1992)
 Les sept secondes de l'arc-en-ciel (novel, 2006)

Pseudonymous works (as 'Delacorta') 
 Nana (1979; Eng. trans. 1984)
 Diva (1979; Eng. trans. 1983)
 Luna (1979; Eng. trans. 1984)
 Rock (1981; some editions titled Lola; Eng. trans.: Lola, 1984)
 Papillons de nuit (1984)
 Vida (1985; Eng. trans. 1985)
 Alba (1985; Eng. trans. 1989)
 Somnambule (essays on photographs by Stanley Greene, 1990)
 Rap à Babylone Beach (1992; Eng. trans. The Rap Factor, 1993)
 Imago (1996)

Works on Tantra and Eastern Mysticism 
 Sculptures tantriques du Népal (1970)
 Nirvana Tao: techniques de méditation (1974; Eng. trans. Nirvana Tao: The Secret Meditation Techniques of the Taoist and Buddhist Masters, 1986; republished as Meditation Techniques of the Buddhist and Taoist Masters, 2003)
 Népal (1976)
 (with Marc de Smedt) Essais sur les mystiques orientales (1984)
 Tantra: l'initiation d'un occidental à l'amour absolu (1996; Eng. trans. Tantric Quest: An Encounter with Absolute Love, 1997)
 Désirs, passions et spiritualité: l'unité de l'être (1999; Eng. trans. Desire: The Tantric Path to Awakening, 2001)
 Lalla. Chants mystiques du tantrisme cachemirien (translation from English, 2000)
 Tantra: spontanéité de l'extase (2000)
 L'incendie du coeur: le chant tantrique du frémissement (2004; Eng. trans. Yoga Spandakarika: The Sacred Texts at the Origins of Tantra, 2005)
 Tantra yoga: le Vijñânabhaïrava Tantra, le 'tantra de la connaissance suprême'  (2004)
 Le grand sommeil des éveillés: interromptu par l'exposition de Mahchinachara, La Grande Voie Chinoise, Coeur du Tantra et du Chan (2005)
 Chan & Zen: le jardin des iconoclastes (2009)
 Tantra: la dimension sacrée de l'érotisme (2013)
 Les portes de la joie: être vraiment zen (6th Feb 2014; Eng. trans. The Doors of Joy: 19 Meditations for Authentic Living, 2014)

See also
 Pagoda of Bailin Temple

Notes

References

External links 
 Daniel Odier's Official Webpage
 
 

Swiss male novelists
Living people
1945 births
20th-century Swiss novelists
21st-century Swiss novelists
20th-century male writers
21st-century male writers